The Olympus OM-D E-M1X is a professional mirrorless interchangeable-lens camera announced by Olympus Corporation in January 2019.

It succeeds the Olympus OM-D E-M1 Mark II, and includes dual TruePic VIII processor, liquid cooling, larger body with an integrated vertical grip with dials, dual batteries, 80 MP tripod composite shot mode, 50 MP handheld composite shot mode, field sensors, improved autofocus tracking, USB power and better built-in stabilization among its improvements.

Reviewers praise the "High Res" mode which allows to captures medium format resolution photos using the sensor-shift method even without a tripod.

Using two TruePic processors (having four cores each) allows E-M1X to use an improved autofocus algorithm developed by deep learning technique.

OM-D E-M1X won Camera Grand Prix 2019 Readers Award.

References

External links

OM-D E-M1X
Cameras introduced in 2019